Angela Dawson may refer to:

Angela Dawson (canoeist) (born 1968), British sprint canoer
Angela Dawson, Baltimore murder victim; see Dawson murder case